Luis Martínez Doreste (born 4 March 1973 in Las Palmas) is a retired Spanish sailor, who specialized in the Laser class. He placed fourth in his respective category at the 2003 ISAF Sailing World Championships in Cadiz, and also obtained top eleven finishes in two editions of the Olympic Games (2000 and 2004). Throughout his sporting career, Martinez trained full-time for the Royal Gran Canaria YC in his native Las Palmas under his personal coach Antón Garrote. Coming from a sailing pedigree, Martinez also competed with his brother and 470 sailor Gustavo Martínez Doreste in two Olympics.

Martinez made his official debut at the 2000 Summer Olympics in Sydney, where he competed in the Laser class. He posted a net score of 97 to establish an eleventh spot in a vast fleet of forty-three sailors, falling behind the top ten by a tight, three-point margin.

At the 2004 Summer Olympics in Athens, Martinez qualified for his second Spanish team, as a 31-year-old, in the Laser class by placing fourth and obtaining a berth from the 2003 ISAF World Championships in Cadiz, Spain. Unlike his previous Olympics, Martinez compensated from an early surge in the opening to satisfy his place in the top ten with a score of 120.

Notes

References

External links
 
 
 
 

1973 births
Living people
Olympic sailors of Spain
Real Club Náutico de Gran Canaria sailors
Sailors at the 2000 Summer Olympics – Laser
Sailors at the 2004 Summer Olympics – Laser
Spanish male sailors (sport)
Sportspeople from Las Palmas